{{DISPLAYTITLE:Mathieu group M23}}

In the area of modern algebra known as group theory, the Mathieu group M23 is a sporadic simple group of order
   2732571123  = 10200960
 ≈ 1 × 107.

History and properties
It is a 4-fold transitive permutation group on 23 objects. The Schur multiplier and the outer automorphism group are both trivial.

 calculated the integral cohomology, and showed in particular that M23 has the unusual property that the first 4 integral homology groups all vanish.

The inverse Galois problem seems to be unsolved for M23. In other words, no polynomial in Z[x] seems to be known to have M23 as its Galois group. The inverse Galois problem is solved for all other sporadic simple groups.

Construction using finite fields

Let  be the finite field with 211 elements.  Its group of units has order  − 1 = 2047 = 23 · 89, so it has a cyclic subgroup  of order 23.

The Mathieu group M23 can be identified with the group of -linear automorphisms of  that stabilize .  More precisely, the action of this automorphism group on  can be identified with the 4-fold transitive action of M23 on 23 objects.

Representations

M23 is the point stabilizer of the action of the Mathieu group M24 on 24 points, giving it a 4-transitive permutation representation on 23 points with point stabilizer the Mathieu group M22. 

M23 has 2 different rank 3 actions on 253 points. One is the action on unordered pairs with orbit sizes 1+42+210 and point stabilizer M21.2, and the other is the action on heptads with orbit sizes 1+112+140 and point stabilizer 24.A7. 

The integral representation corresponding to the permutation action on 23 points decomposes into  the trivial representation and a 22-dimensional representation. The 22-dimensional representation is irreducible over any field of characteristic not 2 or 23. 

Over the field of order 2, it has two 11-dimensional representations, the restrictions of the corresponding representations of the Mathieu group M24.

Maximal subgroups
There are 7 conjugacy classes of maximal subgroups of M23 as follows:

 M22, order 443520
 PSL(3,4):2, order 40320, orbits of 21 and 2
 24:A7, order 40320, orbits of 7 and 16
 Stabilizer of W23 block
 A8, order 20160, orbits of 8 and 15
 M11, order 7920, orbits of 11 and 12
 (24:A5):S3 or M20:S3, order 5760, orbits of 3 and 20 (5 blocks of 4)
 One-point stabilizer of the sextet group
 23:11, order 253, simply transitive

Conjugacy classes

References

 Reprinted in

External links
 MathWorld: Mathieu Groups
 Atlas of Finite Group Representations: M23

Sporadic groups